The riverside tyrant (Knipolegus orenocensis) is a species of bird in the family Tyrannidae.
It is found in Brazil, Colombia, Ecuador, Peru, and Venezuela.
Its natural habitat is subtropical or tropical moist shrubland.

References

riverside tyrant
Birds of Venezuela
Birds of Brazil
riverside tyrant
Taxonomy articles created by Polbot